Scott Eastwood (born Scott Clinton Reeves; March 21, 1986) is an American actor. His notable films are Flags of Our Fathers (2006), Gran Torino (2008), Invictus (2009), The Forger (2012), Trouble with the Curve (2012), Texas Chainsaw (2013), Fury (2014), The Perfect Wave (2014), The Longest Ride (2015), Mercury Plains (2016), Suicide Squad (2016), Snowden (2016), Walk of Fame (2017), The Fate of the Furious (2017), Overdrive (2017), Pacific Rim Uprising (2018), The Outpost (2020), Wrath of Man (2021) and Dangerous (2021). He is the son of actor and filmmaker Clint Eastwood.

Early life

Scott Clinton Reeves was born on March 21, 1986, at the Community Hospital of the Monterey Peninsula in Monterey, California. He is the son of actor-director Clint Eastwood and flight attendant Jacelyn Reeves. He has a younger sister named Kathryn who was born two years after him in 1988, and six known paternal half-siblings: Laurie (b. 1954), Kimber (b. 1964), Kyle (b. 1968), Alison (b. 1972), Francesca (b. 1993) and Morgan (b. 1996). Eastwood was raised in Carmel-by-the-Sea until age ten, after which he moved with his mother to Hawaii. He spent four years in Hawaii before returning to California, where he graduated from Carmel High School. He attended Loyola Marymount University in Los Angeles, where he graduated with a communications degree in 2008.

Career

Eastwood began his career by using his given last name to avoid nepotism, although there is another actor named Scott Reeves. "I've auditioned for pretty much every one of my father's movies," he said in 2015, stating that he was rejected for the Clint Eastwood-directed American Sniper. He briefly appeared in his father's 2008 film Gran Torino, and played Joel Stransky in Invictus.

In April 2010, Eastwood played the lead role in Enter Nowhere, had a supporting role in David Ayer's 2014 film Fury, appeared in the 2015 music video for Taylor Swift's "Wildest Dreams", and starred alongside Britt Robertson in the 2015 film adaptation of Nicholas Sparks' novel The Longest Ride.

In 2016, Eastwood played Lieutenant GQ Edwards in the film Suicide Squad, an adaptation of the DC Comics series. Also that year, he starred alongside Joseph Gordon-Levitt and Shailene Woodley in the biographical drama film Snowden, directed by Oliver Stone, which was released in September.

In 2017, he played a special agent in the action film The Fate of the Furious, and starred in Overdrive, a thriller film which was shot in Paris and Marseille. In 2018, he starred as Nate Lambert in the science fiction follow-up Pacific Rim Uprising.

Personal life
In August 2016, Scott opened up to the media about the death of his former girlfriend, Jewel Brangman, who was killed on September 7, 2014, by a faulty airbag during a minor car accident.

Eastwood learned Brazilian jiu-jitsu after the late Paul Walker got him into martial arts.

Eastwood has opened up about his experiences in Hollywood and compared it to being "in a circus." He stated that "It's an amazing circus at times, but living on the road, I think it would be tough. I don't have a family yet, but I want that someday, and I think about what that would look like with kids and being away from them. That worries me."

Filmography

Film

Television

Music videos

Awards and nominations

References

External links
 
 
 

1986 births
21st-century American male actors
American male film actors
American male television actors
American practitioners of Brazilian jiu-jitsu
Clint Eastwood
Eastwood family
Living people
Loyola Marymount University alumni
Male actors from California
People from Monterey, California